William George Howard, 8th Earl of Carlisle (23 February 1808 – 29 March 1889) was an English clergyman and peer.

Early life

He was born in London the third son of George Howard, 6th Earl of Carlisle and Lady Georgiana Cavendish, daughter of William Cavendish, 5th Duke of Devonshire and Lady Georgiana Spencer (the eldest daughter of John Spencer, 1st Earl Spencer).

Howard was educated at Eton College and Christ Church, Oxford.

Career
He was Rector of Londesborough (a living in the gift of the Earl of Londesborough) in the East Riding of Yorkshire from 1832 for more than forty years until 1877, although from 1866, due to Lord Howard's mentally incapacity, his duties were performed by his replacement.

He succeeded to the title on the death of his elder brother George Howard, 7th Earl of Carlisle on 5 December 1864, he never married. On his death the title passed to his nephew George Howard, 9th Earl of Carlisle.

References

Sources
 
  thepeerage.com
 The Howard Family

External links

1808 births
1889 deaths
William George Howard, 8th Earl of Carlisle
08
People educated at Eton College
Ordained peers
Politicians from London
Alumni of Christ Church, Oxford